Ripiro Beach is a sandy stretch on the west coast of Northland, New Zealand, extending from Pouto Peninsula in the south to Maunganui Bluff in the north. 

At 66 miles (107km) long it is the longest driveable beach in New Zealand, longer than the more famous, but erroneously named Ninety Mile Beach further north. It is straight, and backed by high sand dunes for most of this length. The beach incorporates the coastal settlements of Baylys Beach, Glinks Gully and Omamari.

The swamp at Omamari was drained in 1898, in order for the area to be dug for kauri gum.

This beach is home of the famous local shellfish delicacy called the toheroa. Overexploitation in the 1950s and 1960s caused the population of the shellfish to decline enough that public gathering of the shellfish is now prohibited.

It is the site of numerous shipwrecks, with 110 confirmed shipwrecks recorded between 1839 and 1994, and 17 more unconfirmed.

History 
In either 1807 or 1808 at Moremonui Gully where it enters Ripiro Beach, 19 kilometres (12 miles) south of Maunganui Bluff Ngāti Whātua ambushed Ngāpuhi in the Battle of Moremonui, the first Māori battle to involve muskets, initiating a larger conflict which became known as the Musket Wars.

References 

http://www.kauricoast.co.nz/Feature.cfm?wpid=6344
http://www.newzealand.com/int/article/pouto-peninsula-and-ripiro-beach/
http://www.northlandnz.com/about/features/northland_must_dos/west_coast/ripiro_kai_iwi/

Kaipara District
Beaches of the Northland Region